Monobactams are monocyclic and bacterially-produced β-lactam antibiotics. The β-lactam ring is not fused to another ring, in contrast to most other β-lactams. Monobactams are effective only against aerobic Gram-negative bacteria (e.g., Neisseria, Pseudomonas). Siderophore-conjugated monobactams show promise for the treatment of multi drug-resistant pathogens.

Aztreonam is a commercially available monobactam antibiotic. Other examples of monobactams are tigemonam, nocardicin A, and tabtoxin.

Adverse effects to monobactams can include skin rash and occasional abnormal liver functions.

Monobactam antibiotics exhibit no IgE cross-reactivity reactions with penicillin but have shown some cross reactivity with cephalosporins, most notably ceftazidime, which contains an identical side chain as aztreonam. Monobactams can trigger seizures in patients with history of seizures, although the risk is lower than with penicillins.

References

External links